Amy Franklin (born 4 February 2003) is an Australian rules footballer playing for West Coast in the AFL Women's (AFLW). She has previously played for Fremantle.

AFLW career
Franklin was drafted by Fremantle with their first selection, and 14th overall in the 2021 AFL Women's draft.

Franklin made her debut in the fourth round of the 2022 AFLW season, kicking two goals to help Fremantle beat the Western Bulldogs.

In March 2023, Franklin was traded to West Coast in exchange for picks #3 and #21.

References

External links 

2003 births
Living people
Fremantle Football Club (AFLW) players
Australian rules footballers from Western Australia